"Headband" is a song by American hip hop recording artist B.o.B. It was released on May 21, 2013, as the lead single from his third studio album, Underground Luxury (2013). The song, produced by American hip hop record producer Mustard, features a guest appearance from fellow American rapper 2 Chainz. The song peaked at number 53 on the Billboard Hot 100.

Background
On April 4, 2013 B.o.B revealed he would release his third studio album before his upcoming rock EP. On May 12, 2013 B.o.B tweeted: "Underground Luxury ... coming this summer... #staytuned", revealing the title of his third studio album. On May 13, 2013 radio personality Funkmaster Flex, premiered "Headband", the album's first official single. The song would be released to digital retailers on May 21, 2013.

Music video
On June 29, 2013 behind-the-scenes footage of the music video was released online. The video was directed by Ryan Patrick. On June 30, 2013, the music video premiered on MTV Jams.

Chart performance

Weekly charts

Year-end charts

Certifications

Release history

References

2013 singles
B.o.B songs
2 Chainz songs
Songs written by B.o.B
Songs written by 2 Chainz
Grand Hustle Records singles
2013 songs
Atlantic Records singles
Song recordings produced by Mustard (record producer)
Songs written by Mustard (record producer)
Songs written by Ty Dolla Sign